The men's K-1 5000 metres competition at the 2018 ICF Canoe Sprint World Championships in Montemor-o-Velho on 26 August 2018 took place at the Centro de Alto Rendimento de Montemor-o-Velho.

Schedule
The schedule was as follows:

All times are Western European Summer Time (UTC+1)

Results
As a long-distance event, it was held as a direct final.

References

ICF